Jackson Township is the name of thirty-three townships in Missouri:

 Jackson Township, Andrew County, Missouri
 Jackson Township, Buchanan County, Missouri
 Jackson Township, Callaway County, Missouri
 Jackson Township, Camden County, Missouri
 Jackson Township, Carter County, Missouri
 Jackson Township, Clark County, Missouri
 Jackson Township, Clinton County, Missouri
 Jackson Township, Dallas County, Missouri
 Jackson Township, Daviess County, Missouri
 Jackson Township, Douglas County, Missouri
 Jackson Township, Gentry County, Missouri
 Jackson Township, Grundy County, Missouri
 Jackson Township, Jasper County, Missouri
 Jackson Township, Johnson County, Missouri
 Jackson Township, Linn County, Missouri
 Jackson Township, Livingston County, Missouri
 Jackson Township, Macon County, Missouri
 Jackson Township, Maries County, Missouri
 Jackson Township, Monroe County, Missouri
 Jackson Township, Nodaway County, Missouri
 Jackson Township, Osage County, Missouri
 Jackson Township, Ozark County, Missouri
 Jackson Township, Polk County, Missouri
 Jackson Township, Putnam County, Missouri
 Jackson Township, Randolph County, Missouri
 Jackson Township, Reynolds County, Missouri
 Jackson Township, St. Clair County, Missouri
 Jackson Township, Ste. Genevieve County, Missouri
 Jackson Township, Shannon County, Missouri
 Jackson Township, Shelby County, Missouri
 Jackson Township, Sullivan County, Missouri
 Jackson Township, Texas County, Missouri
 Jackson Township, Webster County, Missouri

See also 
 Jackson Township (disambiguation)

Missouri township disambiguation pages